Pungdeokcheon-dong is a dong located in Suji-gu, Yongin, South Korea.

Education

Elementary schools
 Yongin Pungdeok Elementary School

Middle schools
 Suji Middle School

High schools
 Suji High School

External links 
 Official website of Pungdeokcheon 1-dong 
 Official website of Pungdeokcheon 2-dong

References

Yongin
Neighbourhoods in South Korea